An agrotown is an official type of rural settlement in Belarus introduced by a law passed in 1998. The law defines agrotowns as  well-developed  rural settlements with industrial and social infrastructure to ensure social standards for population living there and in the surrounding areas.

The law further says that if a selsoviet (rural district) has agrotowns, its administrative center must be in an agrotown. If there is more than one agrotown, the selsoviet center is assigned by the District Council of Deputies.

References

Types of populated places
 
Rural geography